Pepin County is a county  in the U.S. state of Wisconsin. As of the 2020 census, the population was 7,318, making it the fourth-least populous county in Wisconsin. Its county seat is Durand. Pepin County is the birthplace of Laura Ingalls Wilder, the author of the Little House on the Prairie children's books.

History
Pepin County was formed in the year 1858 from portions of neighboring Dunn County. Both the town of Pepin (originally named North Pepin in 1856), and the village of Pepin were named after Lake Pepin, a broadening of the Mississippi River between Pepin County and the Counties of Goodhue and Wabasha in the state of Minnesota. The lake itself is likely named for one or more of the Pepin families from the French Canadian city of Trois-Rivières in Quebec, Canada. Several Pepins appear in the early records, including the senior figure Guillaume dit Tranchemontagne and his descendants Pierre and Jean Pepin du Chardonnets. One or both of the latter may have accompanied Daniel Greysolon, the Sieur du Lhut, from Montreal to what is now Duluth, Minnesota, in 1679. Exactly when the body of water was first named Pepin is not known, but the name has been used as early as 1700, making it by far one of the oldest recorded place names in Wisconsin. The name was well accepted by the mid-1760s when Jonathan Carver wrote in his journal, "Arrived at Lake Pepin called by some Lake St. Anthony."

Geography
It is the smallest county in Wisconsin by land area.

Adjacent counties
 Pierce County – northwest
 Dunn County – north
 Eau Claire County – east
 Buffalo County – south
 Wabasha County, Minnesota – southwest
 Goodhue County, Minnesota – west

Major highways
  U.S. Highway 10
  Highway 25 (Wisconsin)
  Highway 35 (Wisconsin)
  Highway 85 (Wisconsin)

Railroads
BNSF

Buses
List of intercity bus stops in Wisconsin

Demographics

2020 census
As of the census of 2020, the population was 7,318. The racial makeup of the county was 94.3% White, 0.5% Native American, 0.3% Asian, 0.3% Black or African American, 1.0% from other races, and 3.5% from two or more races. Ethnically, the population was 2.1% Hispanic or Latino of any race.

2000 census
As of the census of 2000, there were 7,213 people, 2,759 households, and 1,934 families residing in the county. The population density was 31 people per square mile (12/km2). There were 3,036 housing units at an average density of 13 per square mile (5/km2). The racial makeup of the county was 98.90% White, 0.08% Black or African American, 0.19% Native American, 0.21% Asian, 0.04% Pacific Islander, 0.08% from other races, and 0.49% from two or more races. 0.35% of the population were Hispanic or Latino of any race. 41.6% were of German, 13.5% Norwegian, 9.9% Austrian and 6.8% Swedish ancestry. 95.2% spoke English and 3.4% German as their first language.

There were 2,759 households, out of which 32.40% had children under the age of 18 living with them, 59.90% were married couples living together, 6.80% had a female householder with no husband present, and 29.90% were non-families. 26.10% of all households were made up of individuals, and 13.60% had someone living alone who was 65 years of age or older. The average household size was 2.57 and the average family size was 3.13.

In the county, the population was spread out, with 26.50% under the age of 18, 7.90% from 18 to 24, 25.90% from 25 to 44, 22.80% from 45 to 64, and 16.80% who were 65 years of age or older. The median age was 39 years. For every 100 females there were 101.10 males. For every 100 females age 18 and over, there were 100.20 males.

In 2017, there were 41 births, giving a general fertility rate of 79.6 births per 1000 women aged 15–44, the fifth highest rate out of all 72 Wisconsin counties. Additionally, there were no reported induced abortions performed on women of Pepin County residence in 2017.

Government and politics

County Board of Supervisors
Pepin County has a 12-member board of supervisors.

Presidential elections
Prior to the election of 2016, the last time Pepin County voted for the Republican candidate was in 1972, when voters backed President Richard Nixon (R) over George McGovern (D).

 Note: In 1924, Progressive candidate Robert M. La Follette Sr. came in second in Pepin County, receiving  33.59% of the vote (737 votes).

Communities

City
 Durand (county seat)

Villages
 Pepin
 Stockholm

Towns

 Albany
 Durand (town)
 Frankfort
 Lima
 Pepin
 Stockholm
 Waterville
 Waubeek

Census-designated place
 Arkansaw

Unincorporated communities

 Barry Corner
 Devils Corner
 Ella
 Hawkins Corner
 Lakeport
 Lima
 Lund
 Porcupine
 Tarrant

See also
 National Register of Historic Places listings in Pepin County, Wisconsin

References

Further reading
 Curtiss-Wedge, Franklyn (comp.). History of Buffalo and Pepin Counties. Winona, Minn.: H. C. Cooper Jr., 1919.

External links
 Pepin County
 Pepin County map from the Wisconsin Department of Transportation

 
Wisconsin counties on the Mississippi River
1858 establishments in Wisconsin
Populated places established in 1858